The little horned toad (Boulenophrys minor), also known as the dwarf horned toad, Kwangshien spadefoot toad, or tiny spadefoot toad,  is a species of frog in the family Megophryidae. It is found in southern China, Thailand, Vietnam, and possibly in Laos and Myanmar. It has recently been reported from Bhutan.
Its natural habitats are subtropical or tropical moist lowland forests, subtropical or tropical moist montane forests, rivers, and swamps. It is threatened by habitat loss.

References

Boulenophrys
Amphibians of Bhutan
Amphibians of China
Amphibians of Thailand
Amphibians of Vietnam
Taxonomy articles created by Polbot
Amphibians described in 1926